Blondie Has Servant Trouble is a 1940 American comedy film directed by Frank R. Strayer and starring Penny Singleton and Arthur Lake. It is sixth of the series of 28 Blondie movies.

Plot summary
Blondie proves to be a real nuisance to her husband Dagwood and causes domestic disturbance in the Bumstead home, when she insists on getting a maid. Dagwood is forced to take the request seriously, and asks his boss, J.C. Dithers, for a raise. As a rule, Dithers refuses the raise, but instead he offers Dagwood and his family a two-week stay at a country house, complete with servants. The house is the size of a palace, formerly owned by Batterson, a newly deceased magician. With the consent of his wife, Dagwood accepts the offer, and they prepare for take off to the country.

They arrive at the empty house during a terrible thunderstorm, and find out from a local that the place definitely is haunted in some way. When they enter the house they realize that the house truly must be haunted, since it shows definite signs of a poltergeist living there with chairs starting to move around. A man named Horatio Jones is in fact responsible for the haunting by moving the chairs, covered by a white blanket. He has been ordered to do this as an initiation to a lodge he is trying to get membership in.

The haunting continues later in the night when two more persons, Anna and Eric Vaughn, arrive and pretends to be servants, and start a series of frightening events, like sliding panels and moving shadows. Later Anna and Horation disappear from the house, and Dagwood finds a newspaper clipping with a picture of Eric. He reads that his servant is responsible for plunging a knife into the back of an attorney, claiming that he stole Eric's inventions and gave them to Batterson, the former owner of the house. The clip also says that Eric claims to be the rightful heir to the estate and the house.

When Blondie hears about this she regrets that she asked for servants in the first place.   Dagwood sets out to catch Eric, and succeeds just in time to prevent the man from stabbing his own wife Blondie in the back. When the press hears about the events that lead to Eric's capture, they name Dagwood a hero, and he finally gets his raise from his boss.

Cast 
 Penny Singleton as Blondie Bumstead
 Arthur Lake as Dagwood Bumstead
 Larry Simms as Baby Dumpling Bumstead
 Danny Mummert as Alvin Fuddle
 Jonathan Hale as J.C. Dithers
 Arthur Hohl as Eric Vaughn
 Esther Dale as Anna Vaughn
 Irving Bacon as Mr. Crumb, the Mailman
 Ray Turner as Horatio Jones
 Walter Soderling as Morgan
 Fay Helm as Mrs. Fuddle

References

External links 
 
 
 
 

1940 films
Columbia Pictures films
Films directed by Frank R. Strayer
Blondie (film series) films
1940 comedy films
Films scored by Leigh Harline
1940s English-language films
1940s American films